Argentulia is a genus of moths belonging to the family Tortricidae. Members of the genus are unlike any other species in the tribe Euliini.  Male and female genitalia suggest a close relationship to Varifula from Chile.

Species
Argentulia gentilii  Brown, 1998
Argentulia montana  Bartlett-Calvert, 1893

References

 , 1998, J. Lepid. Soc. 52: 178.
 , 2005, World Catalogue of Insects 5

External links
tortricidae.com
Brown, John W. "A New Genus of Tortricid Moths from Chile and Argentina Related to Varifula Razowski (Lepidoptera Tortricidae)." Journal of the Lepdopterist's Society 52.2 (1998): 177-81

Euliini
Tortricidae genera